The 2012 Volvo World Match Play Championship was the 47th Volvo World Match Play Championship played. It was held 17–20 May, with the champion receiving €700,000. The format was 24 players split into eight pools of three, with the top two in each pool progressing to the knock-out stage. It was an official money event on the European Tour.

Course

Format
The 24 players were split into eight pools of three, with the top two in each pool seeded by their Official World Golf Ranking and the remaining eight randomly assigned to a pool. Within each pool, every player played each other in a round-robin format over 18-hole matches. Points were awarded based upon win (2), tie (1) or loss (0). The two leading players from each pool advanced to the knock-out stage. In case of ties, sudden-death playoffs were used to determine rankings.

Participants

Pool play
Source

1st – Cabrera-Bello 
2nd – Finch
3rd – Kaymer

1st – Rose
2nd – Rock
3rd – Clarke

1st – Goosen 
2nd – Colsaerts (Colsaerts wins at the first extra hole against Schwartzel.)
3rd – Schwartzel

1st – McDowell
2nd – Karlsson (Karlsson wins at the first extra hole against Kruger.)
3rd – Kruger

1st – García
2nd – Quirós
3rd – Hiratsuka

1st – Lawrie (Lawrie wins at the first extra hole against Villegas.)
2nd – Villegas
3rd – Hanson

1st – Snedeker (Snedeker wins at the first extra hole against Bjørn and Grace.)
2nd – Bjørn (Bjørn wins at the second extra hole against Grace.)
3rd – Grace

1st – Poulter
2nd – Lewis
3rd – Senden

Playoffs
Source

Prize money breakdown
Source:

Notes and references

External links
Official site
Coverage on the European Tour's official site

Volvo World Match Play Championship
Volvo World Match Play Championship
Volvo World Match Play Championship
Golf tournaments in Spain
May 2012 sports events in Europe